The 1994 Women's World Water Polo Championship was the third edition of the women's water polo tournament at the World Aquatics Championships, organised by the world governing body in aquatics, the FINA. The tournament was held from 1 to 11 September 1994, and was incorporated into the 1994 World Aquatics Championships in Rome, Italy.

Teams

GROUP A

GROUP B

Preliminary round

GROUP A

GROUP B

Final round

Semi finals

Bronze medal match

Final

Final ranking

Individual awards
Most Valuable Player
???

Best Goalkeeper
???

Topscorer
Karin Kuipers - The Netherlands

Medalists

References

Sources
 Results
 World Championship, sportquick

1994
Women's tournament
1994 in women's water polo
Women's water polo in Italy
1994 in Italian women's sport